Richard James Midkiff (September 9, 1914 – October 30, 1956) was a pitcher in Major League Baseball. He pitched in thirteen games for the Boston Red Sox in 1938, receiving two decisions (one win and one loss). He also pitched for Boston's American Association affiliate, the Minneapolis Millers, that season and was a teammate of Ted Williams there.

In the mid-1950s, Midkiff contracted squamous cell carcinoma of the tongue which later spread to his neck and carotid artery. He died at the age of 42 on October 30, 1956 from a massive hemorrhage of his right carotid artery as a result of his cancer.

External links

1914 births
1956 deaths
Boston Red Sox players
Baseball players from Texas
Major League Baseball pitchers
Texas Longhorns baseball players
Minor league baseball managers
Rocky Mount Red Sox players
Syracuse Chiefs players
Little Rock Travelers players
Minneapolis Millers (baseball) players
Baltimore Orioles (IL) players
Memphis Chickasaws players
Birmingham Barons players
Vicksburg Hill Billies players
Natchez Indians players
Del Rio Cowboys players
People from Gonzales, Texas
Deaths from cancer in Texas